The beach soccer tournaments at the 2023 World Beach Games, the second edition of the Games, will be held from 6 to 12 August 2023 in Bali, Indonesia and organised by the Association of National Olympic Committees (ANOC).

Two events will take place: the men's tournament and the women's tournament. A total of 28 teams will participate (16 in the men's competition and 12 in the women's). Both the men's and women's squads can consist of up to 12 players, meaning a total of 336 athletes are expected to take part.

The defending gold medallists are Brazil in the men's event and Spain in the women's category.

Competition schedule
The tournament will begin on 6 August and end on 12 August. Further details TBA.

Qualification
Each National Olympic Committee (NOC) is allowed to enter one men's team and one women's team into the competition. In order to play at the Games, these teams need to qualify.

The six continental confederations of FIFA are each allocated a certain amount of berths at the Games; qualification events are organised for teams to compete against other members of their own confederation to try and earn one of their continent's spots at the Games. ANOC have delegated the responsibility of organising qualification to Beach Soccer Worldwide (BSWW). Qualification tournaments are planned for all confederations, however, for some, these qualification events may ultimately not be realised – if this happens, their teams which occupy the highest positions in the BSWW World Ranking as of 1 July 2023 will be granted qualification. The deadline for qualification to be completed is 2 July 2023.

For both categories, the host country qualifies automatically and one country who failed to qualify will also be invited to compete as a wildcard entry as a lucky loser.

Men's qualification

Women's qualification

Participating NOCs
The following National Olympic Committees (NOCs), as per the outcome of qualification events, will participate (the number of expected participating athletes of each NOC are shown in parentheses).

Men's competition

Women's competition

Medal summary

Medal table

Medalists

See also
2023 FIFA Beach Soccer World Cup
Beach soccer at the 2023 European Games

Notes

References

External links
Bali 2023, at ANOC
Beach Soccer Worldwide, official website

 
World Beach Games
Beach soccer
2023
2023